Zanabazar's square script is a horizontal Mongolian square script (Khevtee Dörvöljin bichig or , Khevtee Dörvöljin Üseg), an abugida developed by the monk and scholar Zanabazar to write Mongolian. It can also be used to write Tibetan and Sanskrit.

It was re-discovered in 1801 and the script's applications during the period of its use are not known. It was also largely based on the Tibetan alphabet, read left to right, and employed vowel diacritics above and below the consonant letters.

Letters

Vowels

Consonants

Others

Unicode

"Zanabazar Square" has been included in the Unicode Standard since the release of Unicode version 10.0 in June 2017. The Zanabazar Square block contains 72 characters.

The Unicode block for Zanabazar Square is U+11A00–U+11A4F:

Reference

See also
Mongolian writing systems
ʼPhags-pa script

External links
BabelStone Fonts for Zanabazar

Brahmic scripts
Mongolian writing systems
Obsolete writing systems